During the 1986–87 English football season, Everton F.C. competed in the Football League First Division. They finished 1st in the table with 86 points. The Toffees advanced to the 5th round of the FA Cup, losing to Liverpool, and to the semifinals of the League Cup, losing to Arsenal.

Final league table

Results

Football League First Division

FA Cup

League Cup

Full Members' Cup

FA Charity Shield

Squad

References

1986-87
Everton
Everton F.C. season
English football championship-winning seasons